Magnus Birgersson, better known by his stage name Solar Fields, is a Swedish electronic music artist. As of 2014, he has released fifteen albums, and has also scored all interactive in-game music for the Electronic Arts game Mirror's Edge as well as its reboot sequel, Mirror's Edge Catalyst. His latest album, Formations, was released on November 4, 2022.

Biography 
Gothenburg-based Swedish composer, sound designer, and multi-instrumentalist Magnus Birgersson created Solar Fields in the late 1990s.

Birgersson was raised in a musical family and began playing piano and synthesizers in the 1970s. In the mid-1980s he began combining synthesizers with computers. In addition to his ambient work, he has also been a guitar player in rock bands, a pianist in jazz funk bands, and keyboard player in drum and bass bands."

He has collaborated with Vincent Villuis, a.k.a. AES Dana, on H.U.V.A. Network and T.S.R. in the company of Daniel Segerstad and Johannes Hedberg from Carbon Based Lifeforms.

Under the moniker Solar Fields he composed 15 albums and appeared on over 60 various compilations. His first solo release was an ambient album named Reflective Frequencies, released on Ultimae in 2001. This was followed two years later by Blue Moon Station, which also included downtempo and trance, and was designed as a single fluid story.

In late 2005, Solar Fields composed Leaving Home and Extended, the latter being a limited edition.

His fifth album EarthShine, launched in 2007, featured more upbeat soundscapes blending morning trance, progressive, psychedelic, tribal and ambient music. This up-tempo album was warmly received by the progressive and psytrance scenes. This led to Electronic Arts and DICE commissioning Solar Fields for the in-game score for Mirror's Edge, a first-person action adventure video game released worldwide on November 14, 2008. The soundtrack was included in the VGC's "Top 20 Original Soundtracks in Gaming".

The following year, Solar Fields composed Movements. The album was ranked in the top 10 of best albums by Echoes listeners. The album Movements was also used as the soundtrack for the indie game Capsized from the small Canadian studio Alientrap in 2011. It remains his most popular album to date.

In 2010, he used the harmonies and melodies of Movements in a remix album titled Altered - Second Movements and started the Origin series, four albums which aim to present archives and unreleased songs. Until We Meet the Sky and Random Friday were composed in parallel.

In 2013, he released the second album in the Origin series, Origin #02. He released his demo song "Cluster" later that year. His song "Pulse", along with a remix of it by Airwave, was released on June 30, 2014 by Joof Recordings.

In July 2014, he released the compilations Red, Green and Blue (collectively known as R.G.B.), which would feature remasters, remixes and alternate versions of previously released tracks.

On September 30, 2015, it was confirmed by DICE and Birgersson that he was creating the in-game score of Mirror's Edge: Catalyst, and that he had been working on said score for twelve months as of the aforementioned date.

On March 29, 2018, his album Ourdom was released. It contained 13 tracks. He had reportedly begun working on it during 2016-2017 as a side project to an unnamed upcoming album, eventually turning it into a separate album entirely.

On June 1, 2019, he released the third album in the Origin series, Origin#03. On November 9, 2019, he would release his first EP, Undiscovered Stories.

On August 21, 2020, he hosted a live stream in collaboration with Messed!Up Magazine called Studio Jupiter Live Session, and on September 4, 2020, he released an album under the same name.

Solar Fields released the follow-up to Ourdom on November 4, 2022, via his own label droneform records. Titled Formations, the full-length studio work consist of 10 tracks which, according to Birgersson, comes in a "different form, shape and emotion".

Discography

Studio albums 
 Reflective Frequencies (2001)
 Blue Moon Station (2003)
 Extended (2005)
 Leaving Home (2005)
 EarthShine (2007)
 Movements (2009)
 Altered – Second Movements (2010)
 Until We Meet the Sky (2011)
 Random Friday (2012)
 Ourdom (2018)
 Formations (2022)

Origin Series
 Origin#01 (2010)
 Origin#02 (2013)
 Origin#03 (2019)

EPs
 Undiscovered Stories (2019)
 Versions (2022)

Live Albums
  Studio Jupiter Live Session (2020)

Compilations
 Red (2014)
 Green (2014)
 Blue (2014)

Soundtracks
 2009:  Mirror's Edge
 2016:  Mirror's Edge Catalyst

Collaborations
 GTCHI97 (1996) (with Carbon Based Lifeforms as TSR)
 Fusion (1998) (with Carbon Based Lifeforms as TSR)
 Distances (2004) (with AES Dana as H.U.V.A. Network)
 Ephemeris (2009) (with AES Dana as H.U.V.A. Network)
 Live at Glastonbury Festival (2010) (with AES Dana as H.U.V.A. Network)
 Ägget (2013) (with Carbon Based Lifeforms as TSR)

References

External links 
 
 Solar Fields on Facebook
 
 
 Solar Fields on Last.fm 
 
 Interview on originalsoundversion.com

Swedish musical groups
Swedish electronic musicians
Swedish composers
Video game composers
Living people
Musical groups established in 2001
Male composers
Year of birth missing (living people)